Huachinera Municipality is a municipality in Sonora in north-western Mexico.

The population of the municipal seat was 732 in 2000.

External links
Huachinera, Ayuntamiento Digital (Official Website of Huachinera, Sonora)

References

Municipalities of Sonora